The sperm whale, or common cachalot, is a large toothed whale belonging to the infraorder Cetacea.

Cachalot may also refer to:

 Cachalot (novel), a 1980 science fiction novel written by Alan Dean Foster
 Cachalot-class submarine, a pair of medium-sized submarines of the United States Navy
 USS Cachalot
 HMS Cachalot
 Camp Cachalot, Myles Standish State Forest near Plymouth, Massachusetts
 Cachalot Peak, Graham Land, Antarctic Peninsula